Hickok is a 2017 American Western film starring Luke Hemsworth, Trace Adkins, Kris Kristofferson and Bruce Dern. It was released in a limited theatrical engagement as well as on video-on-demand by Cinedigm on July 7, 2017.

Plot
Wild Bill Hickok, a legendary lawman and gunslinger, is assigned with taming the wildest cow-town in the west. His reputation for his style of frontier justice is then put to the ultimate test.

Cast
 Luke Hemsworth as Wild Bill Hickok
 Trace Adkins as Phil Poe
 Kris Kristofferson as George Knox
 Bruce Dern as Doc Rivers O'Roark
 Cameron Richardson as Mattie
 Kaiwi Lyman-Mersereau as John Wesley Hardin, aka "Arkansaw"
 Hunter Fischer as Joey
 Jason Lively as Ike
 Robert Catrini as Sheriff Akers
 Britain Simons as The Kid
 Kimberly Alexander as Lou-Ann
 Shane P. Allen as Horse Rider
 Terral Altom as The Stranger

Reception
The film holds a 57% approval rating on Rotten Tomatoes.

References

External links
 
 
 Hickok at The Numbers
 

2017 films
American Western (genre) films
Films set in the 19th century
Films shot in Georgia (U.S. state)
2017 Western (genre) films
Cultural depictions of Wild Bill Hickok
2010s English-language films
Films directed by Timothy Woodward Jr.
2010s American films